Bruno Paulo Machado Barbosa (born 14 February 1990), known as Bruno Paulo, is a Brazilian footballer who plays as a forward.

Club career
Bruno Paulo was born in Rio de Janeiro. A Flamengo youth graduate, he made his first team – and Série A debut on 22 July 2009, coming in as a second-half substitute for fellow youngster Jorbison in a 1–1 home draw against Grêmio Barueri.

Bruno Paulo appeared in four first team matches before leaving Flamengo in December 2009, due to a contract dispute. After having his federative rights acquired by Traffic Group, he was assigned to Desportivo Brasil and subsequently loaned to Palmeiras, Vasco da Gama, Bahia and Atlético Paranaense, appearing rarely for all of those clubs.

After being released by Traffic, Bruno Paulo represented Santo André, Lajeadense and Red Bull Brasil, only being a regular starter at the latter. On 22 May 2014 he joined Osasco Audax, being immediately loaned to Guaratinguetá.

He signed with Corinthians on May 24, 2016.

Honours
Flamengo
Campeonato Brasileiro Série A: 2009

Individual
 December player in the Iraqi Premier League 2022-23

References

External links

1990 births
Living people
Footballers from Rio de Janeiro (city)
Brazilian footballers
Brazilian expatriate footballers
Association football forwards
Campeonato Brasileiro Série A players
Campeonato Brasileiro Série B players
Campeonato Brasileiro Série C players
Campeonato Brasileiro Série D players
Kuwait Premier League players
CR Flamengo footballers
Desportivo Brasil players
Sociedade Esportiva Palmeiras players
CR Vasco da Gama players
Esporte Clube Bahia players
Club Athletico Paranaense players
Esporte Clube Santo André players
Clube Esportivo Lajeadense players
Red Bull Brasil players
Grêmio Osasco Audax Esporte Clube players
Guaratinguetá Futebol players
Santa Cruz Futebol Clube players
Clube de Regatas Brasil players
Grêmio Esportivo Brasil players
Kazma SC players
Brazilian expatriate sportspeople in Kuwait
Expatriate footballers in Kuwait